Raymond Clapper (1892–1944) was a commentator and news analyst for both radio and newspapers who was described in a Life magazine article as "one of America's ablest and most-respected journalists."

Early years 
The son of a farmer of Pennsylvania Dutch ancestry, Clapper was born in La Cygne, Kansas. When he was young, his father moved the family to Kansas City in order to take a factory job to better support his family.

Clapper was a graduate of the University of Kansas. In 1915, he was elected editor-in-chief of the University Daily Kansan, the campus newspaper.

Newspapers 
In the summer of 1916, while he was still enrolled at the University of Kansas, Clapper worked as a reporter for The Kansas City Star. That fall, he began working for United Press wire service in Chicago, Illinois. In 1917, he was promoted to manager of UP's Northwest Bureau, which had headquarters in Chicago and served newspapers in western Canada and portions of six states.

In 1923, Clapper was transferred to Washington, D.C., to report on politics there. Six years later, he was made the manager of UP's Washington operation.

Clapper's success resulted to a large extent from "his objective writing style and his ability to explain the politics and policies of Washington for the average reader." His reputation was enhanced nationally by an exposé, "Racketeering in Washington," that was published in 1933. Later that year he was hired by The Washington Post. A year later, he began a column, "Between You and Me," which was distributed daily to 176 Scripps-Howard Newspapers newspapers.

When he died, Clapper was still officially a political columnist for Scripps-Howard, but he was reporting on the invasion of the Marshall Islands during World War II.

Marquis Childs took over Clapper's column "Washington Calling" when he died.

Radio 
Clapper was a newscaster for the Mutual Broadcasting System in the 1930s and 1940s. In 1942, he replaced Raymond Gram Swing on Mutual's evening newscast when Swing moved to another network. A reviewer writing about Clapper's debut broadcast wrote, "His approach is colloquial, colorful and vivid ..."

He also "read and interpreted" election results on NBC in November 1938 and was part of NBC's team of reporters covering the 1940 Republican convention.

Clapper's success in newspapers and radio led to opportunities in public speaking. An article in the January 24, 1942, issue of Billboard listed Clapper among "top radio names who are currently lecturing or have recently lectured, and who have been getting between $1,000 and $1,500."

Book 
In 1944, Clapper's widow edited some of his columns into a book, Watching the World. It was published by Whittlesey House, McGraw-Hill Book Company, Inc. The book was described in a contemporary advertisement as containing "the cream of his work -- columns, broadcasts, articles ... reflecting outstanding events during those critical years." The book included a 32-page biography of Clapper by Mrs. Clapper.

Personal life 
Clapper married Olive Ewing in 1913. They had a daughter and a son.

Death 
Clapper was killed February 1, 1944, when an airplane in which he was riding collided with another plane during the World War II invasion of the Marshall Islands. "Both planes crashed into a lagoon," a news report said, leaving no survivors.

Legacy 
Clapper's legacy included the following:

 The White House Correspondents' Association awards the Raymond Clapper Award to outstanding journalists. 
 The Raymond Clapper Memorial Association was incorporated March 10, 1944, in Washington, D.C. "to perpetuate the memory of Clapper."
 The Library of Congress has 75,000 items in its "Raymond Clapper papers, 1908-1962" collection.
 In 1944, the World War II Liberty ship  was launched in Jacksonville, Florida. It was sponsored by Clapper's widow and daughter and built by St. Johns River Shipbuilding Company.

References 

Male journalists